Triple-A (officially Class AAA) has been the highest level of play in Minor League Baseball in the United States since 1946. Currently, two leagues operate at the Triple-A level, the International League (IL) and the Pacific Coast League (PCL). There are 30 teams, one per each Major League Baseball (MLB) franchise, with 20 in the IL and 10 in the PCL. Triple-A teams are generally located in smaller cities as well as larger metropolitan areas without MLB teams, such as Austin, Jacksonville, Columbus, and Indianapolis. Four Triple-A teams play in the same metro areas as their parent clubs, those being the Gwinnett Stripers, St. Paul Saints, Sugar Land Space Cowboys and Tacoma Rainiers.

All current Triple-A teams are located in the United States; before 2008, some Triple-A leagues also fielded teams in Canada, and from 1967 to 2020 the Mexican League was classified as Triple-A. Other than the current two Triple-A leagues, only three other leagues have ever held the classification.

History

Prior to 1946, the top level of Minor League Baseball was Double-A, which had been established in 1912. The Triple-A classification was created before the 1946 season, and began with all three leagues then in Double-A moving up to the new level:
 American Association (AA)
 International League (IL)
 Pacific Coast League (PCL)

This structure persisted for the next 75 years with only a few changes:
 1952–1957: The PCL was classified as "Open" for these six seasons, in anticipation of it potentially becoming a third major league; once the Brooklyn Dodgers and New York Giants relocated from New York City to California, the PCL returned to Triple-A for the 1958 season.
 1963–1968: The AA did not operate during these six seasons.
 1967: The Mexican League received Triple-A classification; it had previously been Double-A since 1955
 1979: The Inter-American League debuted with a Triple-A classification; the league disbanded in June
 1998: Teams from the AA, which disbanded after the 1997 season, were added to the PCL and IL

The IL, PCL, and Mexican League continued as Triple-A leagues until Major League Baseball reorganized the minor leagues prior to the 2021 season. At that time, the IL and PCL were temporarily renamed Triple-A East and Triple-A West, respectively. The Mexican League continues to operate, independently. Following MLB's acquisition of the rights to the names of the historical minor leagues, they announced on March 16, 2022, that the leagues would once again be called the International League and the Pacific Coast League, effective with the 2022 season.

Countries
While all current and the majority of past Triple-A teams have been located in the United States, Triple-A teams have also been based in:
 Canada: multiple teams, including the Montreal Royals and Ottawa Lynx of the IL, and the Calgary Cannons and Vancouver Mounties of the PCL
 Cuba: the Havana Sugar Kings were members of the IL from 1954 to 1960
 Dominican Republic: the short-lived Inter-American League had a team based here in 1979
 Mexico: all Mexican League teams
 Panama: one Inter-American League team in 1979
 Puerto Rico: the San Juan Marlins of the IL in 1961, and one Inter-American League team in 1979
 Venezuela: two Inter-American League teams in 1979

Purpose

Triple-A teams' main purpose is to prepare players for the major leagues. ESPN wrote in 2010:

Both young players and veterans play for Triple-A teams:

Most, if not all, of the players on an MLB team's expanded roster who are not currently on the team's active roster are assigned to the team's Triple-A club. Expanded rosters consist of 40 players, while active rosters generally consist of 26 players as of the 2021 season. Most Triple-A teams are near their MLB parent club, as activating a Triple-A player as an injury replacement is a common occurrence.

The term "AAAA player," pronounced "four-A" or "quadruple-A," refers to a player who succeeds when playing for Triple-A teams and who is not successful at the major league level. The term is usually used derisively and has itself been criticized as flawed. Major league team executives and managers disagree whether AAAA players exist.

Leagues
Teams at this level are divided into two leagues: the International League and the Pacific Coast League. The International League fields teams primarily in the Eastern United States, while the Pacific Coast League fields teams mostly in the Western United States. Each of the 30 major league teams has an affiliation with one Triple-A team in the United States.

Current teams

International League

Pacific Coast League

Triple-A All-Star Game

The Triple-A All-Star Game was a single game held between the two affiliated Triple-A leagues—the International League and the Pacific Coast League. Each league fielded a team composed of the top players in their respective leagues as voted on by fans, the media, and each club's field manager and general manager. The event took place every year since 1988 when the first Triple-A All-Star Game was played in Buffalo, New York. Prior to 1998, a team of American League-affiliated Triple-A All-Stars faced off against a team of National League-affiliated Triple-A All-Stars.

Traditionally, the game was held on the day after the mid-summer Major League Baseball All-Star Game. Such games mark a symbolic halfway-point in the season, despite occurring later than the actual halfway-point of most seasons. Both Triple-A leagues shared a common All-Star break, with no regular-season games scheduled for two days before the All-Star Game itself. Some additional events, such as the All-Star Fan Fest and Triple-A Home Run Derby, were held each year during this break in the regular season.

While the 2021 schedule originally included a three-day All-Star break of July 12–14, this was removed after Opening Day was pushed back one month. Team schedules for the 2021 season were subsequently issued without an All-Star break.

Triple-A Championship

Beginning in 2006, the annual Triple-A National Championship Game was held to serve as a single championship game between the champions of the International League and Pacific Coast League to determine an overall champion of Triple-A baseball. It was originally held annually at Chickasaw Bricktown Ballpark in Oklahoma City, and known as the Bricktown Showdown. Starting in 2011, the game was held in a different Triple-A city each year. Previous postseason interleague championships include the Junior World Series (1932–34, 1936–62, 1970–71, 1973–74), Triple-A World Series (1983, 1998–2000), and Triple-A Classic (1988–91).

For the 2021 season, in place of the National Championship Game, Minor League Baseball extended the Triple-A regular season to October 3, with league champions determined based on regular-season records through the original end date of the season (September 19 for Triple-A East, and September 21 for Triple-A West). The final 10 games of the season, played after those dates, were deemed the "Final Stretch", with the team posting the best winning percentage during that period (the Durham Bulls, who went 9–1) winning a cash prize. Beginning with the 2022 season, the Triple-A National Championship Game is played once more between the champions of the International League and the Pacific Coast League.

Pace-of-play initiatives
As a part of professional baseball's pace of play initiatives implemented in 2015, 20-second pitch clocks entered use at Triple-A stadiums in 2015. In 2018, the time was shortened to 15 seconds when no runners are on base. Other significant changes implemented in 2018 included beginning extra innings with a runner on second base and limiting teams to six mound visits during a nine-inning game. For the 2019 season, the number of mound visits was reduced to five, and pitchers were required to face a minimum of three consecutive batters unless the side is retired or the pitcher becomes injured and is unable to continue playing.

Timeline of AAA baseball leagues

References

External links

Minor league baseball
International League
Pacific Coast League